Ulotrichopus meyi is a moth of the  family Erebidae. It is found in Burundi and Uganda.

References

Moths described in 2005
Ulotrichopus
Moths of Africa